Cardross is a village in Argyll and Bute, Scotland.

Cardross may also refer to:

Places
 Cardross, Victoria, Australia
 Cardross Lakes, an irrigation drainage basin system near the town
 Cardross, Saskatchewan, Canada

People
 John Erskine of Cardross (1662–1743), Scottish soldier and politician

Other
 Cardross road crash, resulted in the deaths of six teenagers near Cardross, Victoria in 2006